Pamela Jones, PJ, is a website editor.

Pamela Jones or Pam Jones may also refer to:

Pamela Jones, character in Alice Upside Down
Pamela Jones, character in Bridget Jones's Diary
Pamjones, minor planet

See also
Pamela Jones Harbour
Pamela Goldsmith-Jones